Leo Perenos was a Byzantine governor (doux) of Dyrrhachium, and the penultimate Catepan of Italy.

In April 1064, as the doux of Dyrrhachium, Perenos provided military and financial aid to Robert, the Norman Count of Mentescaglioso, who was revolting against his uncle, Duke Robert Guiscard of the Apulia and Calabria.

In 1068, the incumbent Catepan of Italy, Abulchares, died. Perenos was appointed as his replacement. The capital of the Catepanate, Bari, had been besieged by the Normans. However, Perenos could not provide a relief mission, as he was unable to cross the sea.

Sources
Leon (20276) Perenos, doux of Italy. Prosopography of the Byzantine World.
 

11th-century catepans of Italy
Byzantine governors of Dyrrhachium
Byzantine people of the Byzantine–Norman wars